Shirdi Sai is a 2012 Indian Telugu-language biographical film, produced by A.Mahesh Reddy on AMR Sai Krupa Entertainments banner, directed by K. Raghavendra Rao. Starring Nagarjuna as the 19th-20th century spiritual guru Sai Baba of Shirdi who lived in western India, it is the cinematic depiction of some of his landmark life episodes, his teachings and his way of life. Music was composed by M. M. Keeravani.  Shirdi Sai was released worldwide on 6 September 2012, and has received mixed to positive reviews while Nagarjuna received critical acclaim for his performance in the titular role with most reviewers hailing this as one of his career best performances.

Plot
Shirdi Sai (Nagarjuna) appears in Shirdi at an early age and disappears. He goes to the Himalayas and returns to Shirdi after a gap of 9 years. He chooses a dilapidated mosque as his abode. Amazed by his presence and miracles, the local people start calling him Sai Baba. He kept helping people around and spreading communal harmony by saying that there is only one God. Certain local people are suspicious of Sai Baba after they learn about his greatness over a period of time. The rest of the story is all about what Sai Baba did to make Shirdi the only pilgrimage for people of all religions and entering Samadhi.

Cast

 Nagarjuna as Lord Shirdi Sai Baba
 Srikanth as Dasaganu
 Srihari as Colonel Wales
 Sai Kumar as Nanavali
 Sayaji Shinde as Bhatia
 Sarath Babu as Mahalsapati
 Dharmavarapu Subramanyam as Nayak [Animal Seller]
 Tanikella Bharani as Bhooti
 Bramhanandam as Sandeham
 Ali as Appoo
 Ananth as Dappoo
 Sai Kiran as Lord Vishnu, Rama & Krishna
 Koushik Babu as Tatya 
 Sameer as Lord Shiva
 Deeshetulu as Venkhusa
 Ashok Kumar 
 Jenny
 Kamalinee Mukherjee as Radhakrishna Mai
 Vinaya Prasad as Baajiya Bai
 Rohini Hattangadi as Ganga Bai
 Rujuta Deshmukh as Lakshmi Bai
 Jhansi
 Dipali Dodke as Radha Bai
 Jyothi Reddy as Goddess Lakshmi
 Karuna as Goddess Parvathi
 Pramodini as Goddess Saraswathi
 Nagesh Bhosale as Chand Patil
 Devendra Dodke as Shyaama
 Gundu Sudarshan
 Dinakar Gavande 
 Ravi Bhath 
 Aditya 
 Pardha Saradhi  
 Master Athulith as Young Tatya 
 Master  Vijay as Young Saibaba

Soundtrack

The music was composed by M. M. Keeravani. Music released on Vel Records Music Company.

Reception
The film received mixed to positive reviews with most reviewers hailing Nagarjuna's performance as one of his best and major plus point of this film. He received wide critical acclaim for his work in this film. Popular Telugu movie reviewing website idle brain gave a positive review stating "Nagarjuna epitomized Shirdi Sai Baba with his perfect portrayal of the sadguru. His pure eyes, calmness in the face and authentic body language makes us all fall in love with his character. Nagarjuna is extraordinary in climax episode with a white beard. Nagarjuna will get awards for his exceptional work. Since it’s a bio-pic, Shirdi Sai should not be viewed like a commercial film. Everyone of us has the curiosity to know more about Sai Baba. We might have read some books. But none of these readings give us a complete picture on life and times of Sai Baba. The film Sai Baba attempts to tell the world about the making of an enlightened man called Sai Baba who is revered as a God today. You may watch Shirdi Sai with an academic interest.".

Rediff gave a positive review and rated 3 on a scale of 5, stating "Nagarjuna steals the show as Shirdi Sai. He exudes serenity and tranquillity necessary for portraying such a role. The calmness in his face and body language and the compassion in his eyes are remarkable. Shirdi Sai is yet another feather in Nagarjuna's cap after Annamayya and Sriramadasu. The film has a shot of the sanctum at Shirdi as a bonus for followers of the sage!"

123telugu.com quoted "Nagarjuna deserves a hearty applause for having the courage to take up this role and he has managed to pull it off with conviction.This film will appeal immensely to Sai Baba devotees and it will be a good watch for casual movie lovers. Watch the film without any expectations and immerse yourself in Sai Baba’s spirituality.

The Hindu gave a positive review stating, " Nagarjuna leads from the front, putting up a performance marked with maturity and restraint. In the last one hour of the film, you tend to forget you are watching an actor rooted in mainstream cinema. Bent with age and bereft of his usual mannerisms, the actor comes up with a commendable performance. The supporting cast that includes Srikanth, Sarath Babu, Rohini Hattangady, Shayaji Shinde, Saikumar and others come up with credible performances. Is Shirdi Sai worth your time and money? It surely is for Saibaba devotees or if you want to watch Nagarjuna revel in his role of Saibaba."

NDTV quoted that "Far different from regular cinema with clichéd performance, run-of-the-mill storyline, director K Raghavendra Rao's Shirdi Sai takes you on a spiritual journey of self-actualization, purity and sanctity, The Box Office Collection Was Above 30 Crores Which is a good record for deviotional flicks.Times of India also gave a good rating stating that "A film like Shirdi Sai calls for strong conviction and Nagarjuna's move to take up this film is commendable. Entertainment oneindia praised the individual performances and technical aspects of the film.

Accolades

See also
Sri Shirdi Saibaba Mahathyam, a 1986 Telugu film starring Vijayachander as Shirdi Sai Baba.

Others
VCD & DVD on Volga Videos, Hyderabad

References

External links
 

2012 films
2010s Telugu-language films
Indian biographical films
Films directed by K. Raghavendra Rao
Films scored by M. M. Keeravani
Sai Baba of Shirdi
Indian historical films
2010s biographical films
2010s historical films